Apple worm may refer to:
 Codling moth, organism
 Apple Worm, computer program